Book of the Kindred is a 1996 role-playing game supplement published by White Wolf Publishing for Vampire: The Masquerade.

Contents
Book of the Kindred is a primer for the World of Darkness, full of short unrelated chapters.

Reception
Martin Klimes reviewed Book of the Kindred for Arcane magazine, rating it a 3 out of 10 overall. Klimes comments that "The material is of good quality, with descriptions of the Camarilla, of the language of the damned, some short stories set in White Wolf's beloved San Francisco, and even an extract of the Book of Nod. However, it's all window dressing to convert a channel-hopping TV audience into a gameplaying mass readership. There is nothing here that the Vampire: The Masquerade rulebook doesn't offer. If you know what Vampire is about, then you have no use for this book. If you don't then maybe you can justify buying it, even without seeing the series to get you interested. Maybe. Frankly, if you're a roleplayer then you will know if you're interested in roleplaying, and a glance through the rulebook will impart just as much information. Buy that instead, and Book of the Kindred be damned."

Reviews
Casus Belli V1 #93 (Apr 1996)

References

External links
Guide du Rôliste Galactique

Role-playing game books
Role-playing game supplements introduced in 1996
Vampire: The Masquerade